Havstein can refer to:

 Havstein parish, parish in Trondheim, Norway
 Havstein Church, located in Havstein parish
 Havstein Island, Antarctica